Richard Tyler Lovelady (born July 7, 1995) is an American professional baseball pitcher for the Kansas City Royals of Major League Baseball (MLB).

Amateur career
Lovelady attended First Presbyterian Christian Academy in Hinesville, Georgia and played college baseball at East Georgia State College and Kennesaw State University. He was drafted by the Kansas City Royals in the 10th round of the 2016 Major League Baseball draft.

Professional career
Lovelady made his professional debut with the Arizona League Royals and was promoted to the Idaho Falls Chukars during the season; in 25 total relief innings pitched between both teams, he posted a 2-1 record, 1.80 ERA and a 0.92 WHIP In 2017, he spent time with both the Wilmington Blue Rocks and the Northwest Arkansas Naturals, pitching to a combined 4-2 record and 1.62 ERA in 66.2 total relief innings pitched. Lovelady spent 2018 with the Omaha Storm Chasers, going 3-3 with a 2.47 ERA in 46 relief appearances. In 2019, he opened the season with Omaha.

Lovelady was promoted to the majors for the first time on April 9, 2019. He made his major league debut against the Seattle Mariners that evening, recording two strikeouts in one inning of relief. Lovelady made 1 appearance for the Royals in 2020, giving up one run over one inning pitched.

In 20 appearances for the Royals in 2021, Lovelady recorded a 3.48 ERA in 20 appearances for the team. On September 30, 2021, Lovelady underwent Tommy John surgery, which wiped him out for the entire 2022 season.

On November 30, Lovelady was non-tendered by the Royals, making him a free agent. He was re-signed by the Royals the next day on a minor league contract. He had his contract selected to protect him from the 2023 rule 5 draft.

Personal life
Lovelady and his wife, Maddie, married in 2019.

References

External links

Kennesaw State Owls bio

1995 births
Living people
People from Hinesville, Georgia
Baseball players from Georgia (U.S. state)
Kansas City Royals players
Major League Baseball pitchers
Kennesaw State Owls baseball players
Arizona League Royals players
Idaho Falls Chukars players
Wilmington Blue Rocks players
Northwest Arkansas Naturals players
Omaha Storm Chasers players